The ARIA Hip Hop/R&B Album Chart, formerly the ARIA Urban Album Chart, ranks the highest selling hip hop and R&B albums within Australia and is provided by the Australian Recording Industry Association.

History
The Hip Hop/R&B Album Chart was established as the Urban Album Chart in 2001 and first published on 1 January of that year. The chart still runs weekly . The current number one is SOS by SZA.

Trivia

Albums with the most weeks at number one

33 weeks
The Black Eyed Peas – The E.N.D. (2009–2010)
32 weeks
The Black Eyed Peas – Monkey Business (2005–2006)
26 weeks
The Kid Laroi – F*ck Love (2020–2021)
24 weeks
Doja Cat – Planet Her (2021–2022)
23 weeks
Bruno Mars – Doo-Wops & Hooligans (2011–2012)
Hilltop Hoods – Walking Under Stars (2014–2015)
Post Malone – Hollywood's Bleeding (2019–2020)
22 weeks
Eminem – The Eminem Show (2002–2003)
Macklemore & Ryan Lewis – The Heist (2012–2013)
21 weeks
Beyoncé – I Am... Sasha Fierce (2008–2009)
19 weeks
The Black Eyed Peas – Elephunk (2004–2005)
17 weeks
Various artists – 8 Mile (2002–2003)
Nelly Furtado – Loose (2006–2007)
Eminem – Recovery (2010)
Kendrick Lamar – Damn (2017)
Eminem – Kamikaze (2018–2019)
16 weeks
Chris Brown – Exclusive (2008)
Post Malone – Beerbongs & Bentleys (2018–2019)
14 weeks
Craig David – Born to Do It (2001)
Justin Timberlake – FutureSex/LoveSounds (2006–2007)
SZA - SOS (2022-2023)

Artists with the most number ones
 Eminem (11)
 Drake (11)

Artists with the most weeks at number one
114 weeks
Eminem
84 weeks
The Black Eyed Peas

See also
ARIA Urban Singles Chart

References

Australian record charts